Guannan County is under the administration of Lianyungang, Jiangsu province, China.

Administrative divisions
In the present, Guannan County has 9 towns and 5 townships.
9 towns

5 townships

Climate

References

www.xzqh.org

External links

 
County-level divisions of Jiangsu
Lianyungang